Bone of My Bones is the debut album by English singer Ebony Bones, an alias of Ebony Thomas.

Track listing

 "We Know All About U" contains a sample from "Bulgarian Chicks" by Balkan Beat Box.
 "Don't Fart On My Heart" contains a sample from "Eu Sou O Rio" by Black Future.

Chart performance

Release history

References 

Ebony Bones albums
2009 debut albums